Wilson Tovey (16 October 1874 – 4 March 1950) was an English cricketer. He played one match for Gloucestershire in 1901.

References

1874 births
1950 deaths
English cricketers
Gloucestershire cricketers
People from Cirencester
Sportspeople from Gloucestershire